Andrea Venturini (born 15 August 1996) is an Italian professional footballer who plays as a centre back for Serie D club Alcione.

Club career
Born in Cesena, Venturini started his career in local clubs Santarcangelo and A.C. Cesena. In 2016, he was loaned to Romagna Centro, on this team Venturini made his senior debut in Serie D.

On 22 June 2016, he joined to Serie D club Ravenna. The team won the promotion to Serie C this season, winning the Group D. Venturini made his professional debut on 27 August 2017 against Fermana.

On 4 July 2018, he signed with Serie C club Rimini.

After one season, he returned to Serie D and joined to Mantova.

For the 2020–21 season, he moved to Fidelis Andria. Fidelis won the promotion by repechage, and Venturini returned to Serie C.

On 31 January 2022, he signed with Pistoiese at winter market.

References

External links
 
 

1996 births
Living people
People from Cesena
Sportspeople from the Province of Forlì-Cesena
Footballers from Emilia-Romagna
Italian footballers
Association football central defenders
Serie C players
Serie D players
Santarcangelo Calcio players
A.C. Cesena players
Cesena F.C. players
Ravenna F.C. players
Rimini F.C. 1912 players
Mantova 1911 players
S.S. Fidelis Andria 1928 players
U.S. Pistoiese 1921 players